Michael K. Noonan was an Irish Cumann na nGaedheal politician who sat as a Teachta Dála (TD) in Dáil Éireann in the 1920s.

He was elected to the 4th Dáil at a by-election on 18 November 1924 for the Cork East constituency, following the death of Cumann na nGaedheal TD Thomas O'Mahony. He lost his seat at the June 1927 general election and did not stand again.

References

Year of birth missing
Year of death missing
Cumann na nGaedheal TDs
Members of the 4th Dáil
Politicians from County Cork